Leigh may refer to:

Places

In England 
Pronounced :
 Leigh, Greater Manchester, Borough of Wigan
 Leigh (UK Parliament constituency)
 Leigh-on-Sea, Essex

Pronounced :
 Leigh, Dorset
 Leigh, Gloucestershire
 Leigh, Kent
 Leigh, Staffordshire
 Leigh, Surrey
 Leigh, Wiltshire
 Leigh, Worcestershire
 Leigh-on-Mendip, Somerset (also known as Leigh upon Mendip)
 Leigh Delamere, Wiltshire
 Leigh Green, Kent
 Leigh Park, Hampshire
 Leigh Sinton, Worcestershire
 Leigh Woods, Somerset
 Abbots Leigh, Somerset
 East Leigh, Devon
 Little Leigh, Cheshire
 Little Leighs, Essex
 North Leigh, Oxfordshire

Elsewhere 
 Leigh, County Tipperary, Ireland
 Leigh, Nebraska, United States
 Leigh, New South Wales, in Bellingen Shire, Australia
 Leigh, New Zealand
 Leigh, Texas, United States, the location of historic site Mimosa Hall
 Leigh Canyon and Leigh Lake, Wyoming, United States
 Leigh River (Victoria), Australia

Other uses
 Leigh (name), a surname and given name
 Baron Leigh of Stoneleigh, Warwickshire, England
 Leigh & Orange, Hong Kong
 Leigh Centurions, a rugby league football club in Greater Manchester
 Leigh's disease, a rare neurometabolic disorder of the central nervous system
 Leigh Light, an antisubmarine device used in World War II

See also 
 LEA (disambiguation)
 Leah (disambiguation)
 Lee (disambiguation)
 Austen-Leigh